Mohammad Zahir may refer to:
 Mohammad Zahir Shah, the last king of Afghanistan
 Mohammad Zahir (cricketer), Afghan cricketer